Daswanth or Dasavant (d. 1584) was a Mughal-era painter in the service of Akbar.

He was a Hindu, probably of humble origin and was trained by the Persian master painter Khwāja ʿAbd al-Ṣamad. Of the large number of painters who worked in the imperial atelier, Daswanth and Basāvan were documented by name.

Daswanth played the leading part in the illustration of the Jaipur originating family of folk tales called Razm-nāmeh, which is the Persian name for the Indian epic known as the Mahabharata.

A miniature in the Cleveland Museum of Art’s manuscript copy of the Ṭūṭī-nāmeh (“Parrot Book”) has also been attributed to him. 

Daswanth also illustrated one miniature in 'Tarikh-i-khandan-i-Timuriya' of Patna with other Artist Jagjiwan kalan.
Of unstable mind, he killed himself in a fit of madness.

References

16th-century births
16th-century Indian painters
1584 deaths
Mughal painters